Joe Egan is a retired heavyweight boxer, actor, and after dinner speaker.

Egan was a participant in Dublin's Phoenix Club as an amateur boxer. Egan appeared in the 2009 film Sherlock Holmes. Egan was dubbed “toughest white man on the planet” by boxing legend Mike Tyson. Egan has won the Irish Heavyweight Boxing championship four times. In 2009 Egan published his autobiography.

References

Irish male boxers
Living people
Year of birth missing (living people)